Mutki, is a town in Bitlis Province, Turkey. It is the seat of Mutki District. Its population is 2,294 (2021). The current mayor is Vahdettin Barlak (AKP).

Notable people 

 Zaro Aga, longest living Kurdish Man (disputed)

References

External links
 Website of the Municipality of Mutki

Populated places in Bitlis Province
Mutki District
Towns in Turkey
Kurdish settlements in Turkey